Victor Russell "Vic" Miranda was an American college football player and insurance executive. He was a two-way lineman for coaches Bob Woodruff and Ray Graves' Florida Gators football teams. A native of Miami, Miranda faced assault charges as a freshman. Miranda was selected All-SEC and AP Honorable Mention All-America in 1960, a year in which his defense helped spark the Gators to a defeat of Baylor in the Gator Bowl. The Gators halted a 75-yard drive by Baylor on the half-yard line in the first quarter, setting the stage for two second quarter touchdowns. Larry Libertore was the game's MVP. Miranda also won the school's coveted Fergie Ferguson Award. He was inducted into the University of Florida Athletics Hall of Fame as a "Gator Great." Miranda was also a prominent booster for the Gators program, once president of boosters.

See also
 List of University of Florida Athletic Hall of Fame members

References

American football guards
Florida Gators football players
North Miami Senior High School alumni
Players of American football from Miami